The torokhkalo - (Kalatalo, Torokhkavka, Klepach) is a Ukrainian folk instrument used in folk ensembles whenever a drum is not available. It was also used by night guards to scare away intruders. The instrument is made from a piece of wood with a handle. A second piece of wood shorter than the first is joined to the original piece by metal rings near from the handle. A hole is drilled through both pieces at one end and a wooden bolt is placed through the hole so that the additional piece can move a small distance. When the instrument is spun around it produces a very loud sound amplified by the stillness of the night. 

A variant of the torokhkalo is the klepach that consists of a wooden hammer on an axis which is swung from one side to the other.

See also
Ukrainian folk music

Sources

Humeniuk, A. - Ukrainski narodni muzychni instrumenty - Kyiv: Naukova dumka, 1967
Mizynec, V. - Ukrainian Folk Instruments - Melbourne: Bayda books, 1984
Cherkaskyi, L. - Ukrainski narodni muzychni instrumenty // Tekhnika, Kyiv, Ukraine, 2003 - 262 pages. 

Ukrainian musical instruments
Idiophones